Brezovica is a village north of Velika Polana in the Prekmurje region of Slovenia.

References

External links
Brezovica on Geopedia

Populated places in the Municipality of Velika Polana